Godfrey Chibanga (born February 16, 1989) is a Zambian football player who is currently a free agent. He scored his first league goal with RoPS against Klubi-04 on September 5, 2010.

Chibanga and eight other RoPS players got sacked in the spring of 2011 due to a match fixing scandal.

References
 Guardian Football

1989 births
Living people
Zambian footballers
Zambian expatriate footballers
Expatriate footballers in Finland
Zambian expatriate sportspeople in Finland
Association football midfielders
People from Copperbelt Province
Rovaniemen Palloseura players
Veikkausliiga players